Sofia Dara (born 14 July 1963) is a Greek swimmer. She competed at the 1980 Summer Olympics and the 1984 Summer Olympics.

References

External links
 

1963 births
Living people
Greek female freestyle swimmers
Olympic swimmers of Greece
Swimmers at the 1980 Summer Olympics
Swimmers at the 1984 Summer Olympics
Sportspeople from Piraeus
Mediterranean Games medalists in swimming
Mediterranean Games gold medalists for Greece
Swimmers at the 1983 Mediterranean Games
Swimmers at the 1979 Mediterranean Games